Muli Tibetan Autonomous County (smi-li rang-skyong-rdzong; Yi:  mup li op zzup zyt jie jux dde xiep) is in the Liangshan Yi Autonomous Prefecture in the southwest of Sichuan province, China, bordering Yunnan province to the southwest. It is a remote, mountainous and forested region with few roads. The highest peaks are nearly 6000 metres in height.  The trio of the sacred Konkaling mountains - Shenrezig, Jambeyang and Chanadorje in Yading Natural Park - lie to the west in Daocheng County, barely accessible by rough jeep track from Chabulang in northern Muli County.

Geography

The county is characterised by the canyons formed by three rivers flowing from north to south: the Shuiluo River, the Litang River, and the Yalong River that carves out a huge canyon before flowing into the Yangtze River.

Climate

Demographics
Muli county has a population of  more than 125,000. The inhabitants of Muli include many of China's minorities, predominantly Tibetan and Yi as well as Pumi and Naxi people. There are also some ethnic Mongol people who settled here after the pacification expeditions of Kublai Khan in the 11th century.

Ethnic groups in Muli, 2000 census

Economy
The main resources in Muli are hydro electric power from the rivers and a wide variety of plants used in traditional Chinese medicine, such as Chinese caterpillar fungus. The remote location and low population have allowed many protected species to survive here, including the white-lipped deer and stump-tailed macaque.

Muli is famous for its gold producing rivers, which are still exploited on a small, non-industrial scale. Its broad expanses of forests were also heavily logged until a logging ban was introduced in 1999. Now most of the local economy is based on agriculture and livestock. Forests include hemlock, cypress, yellow cedars, as well as spruce and fir trees.

Muli is also known for its azalea, rhododendron, and walnut plants.

History
Before 1580, Muli was a colony of the Naxi kingdom and dominated by the Kagyu school of Tibetan Buddhism. After 1640, it became a stronghold of the Tibetan Buddhist Geluk school and was deeply involved in the power struggles between the Geluk and Kakyu schools as well as the Tibetans and Mongols.

Until 1950, Muli was a semi-independent theocratic kingdom ruled by a series of hereditary lama kings based at the trio of Gelug Buddhist monasteries at old Muli, Kulu and Waerdje. These lamaseries were overthrown by the new Communist government of China in the 1950s and destroyed during the Cultural Revolution. It was originally built in the early Qing dynasty, took 12 years to build and was completed in the 17th year of the reign of the Shunzhi Emperor, around 1600. It was modelled on important lamaseries in Tibet and is said to have contained an impressive golden statue of Maitreya over 10 metres high.

Since 1987, Muli Monastery has been partly restored and now has about eighty young monks in residence. It is near a modern small town called Wachang, located high up on the western edge of the Litang River Valley at about 3000 metres altitude. The other monasteries are Kulu (now known as Kangwu), which has been partially rebuilt, and Waerdje (now
Wa’erzhai) which is still in ruins.

Muli was visited by the botanist and explorer Joseph Rock in the 1920s and 1930s. He befriended the then lama king, Chote Chaba, and used the monastery as a base for exploring and plant collecting in the then unvisited regions of Mount Gongga and Yading. Joseph Rock wrote colourful accounts of his encounters with the eccentric lama ruler of Muli in National Geographic. These are said to have been the inspiration for the writer James Hilton and his novel Lost Horizon, about a remote monastery in the Himalayas.

References

  Sichuan's Muli Tibetan Autonomous County

Tibetan autonomous counties
County-level divisions of Sichuan
Former monarchies of Asia